The Stadium Merdeka (also known as Merdeka Stadium/; English: Independence Stadium) is a stadium based in Kuala Lumpur, Malaysia. It is known as the site of the formal declaration of independence of the Federation of Malaya on 31 August 1957. The stadium is also the site of the proclamation of Malaysia on 16 September 1963.

Currently owned by Permodalan Nasional Berhad (PNB), the stadium has a lower and an upper terrace, with a total capacity of 25,000, as well as 14 tunnels entrance, a covered stand, 50 turnstiles and 4 floodlight tower. The stadium was designed by American architect Stanley Jewkes, under the instruction of the first Prime Minister of Malaysia, Tunku Abdul Rahman. Upon its completion, the stadium holds the world record for the tallest prestressed floodlight towers and the biggest cantilever shell roofs. The stadium was also the largest stadium in the Southeast Asia at the time of completion.

The stadium was the principal venue in Kuala Lumpur for celebrations and sporting events until 1998 when the Bukit Jalil National Stadium was built for the 16th Commonwealth Games. Prior to that, the stadium was the home ground for the Malaysian national football team. The stadium witnessed the historic qualifying match of the 1980 Olympic Games, when the national football team last qualified the Olympic Games. However, due to the boycott led by the United States, the country did not participate in the final tournament. The stadium was also the venue for the Merdeka Tournament until 1995. Besides that, the stadium had hosted three out of the five Southeast Asian Games held in Kuala Lumpur. The stadium also hosted the fight between the legendary boxer Muhammad Ali and British boxer Joe Bugner in 1975, prior to the Thrilla in Manila. In 1975, the stadium also hosted the Hockey World Cup final between Pakistan and India.

The stadium is currently a national heritage building. In 2008, the Stadium Merdeka received the UNESCO Asia-Pacific Award for Excellence for Heritage Conservation owing to its cultural significance and embodiment of a unique independence declaration event.

History

Background 
Since the 1930s, the Football Association of Selangor (F.A.S) commonly referred to as Selangor F.C., had been urging the government for a professional football stadium to be built. The request had been ignored as there's in fact a MAHA Stadium, the first stadium of Selangor F.C. in collaboration with MAHA (Malayan Agri-Horticultural Association), is still there located at Jalan Ampang at that time. However, the MAHA Stadium was ruined by the Japanese army in the World War II. After the war, the F.A.S and the Football Association of Malaya (FAM) stepped up their efforts to get a new stadium as the MAHA Stadium in Jalan Ampang is now unusable. After Tunku Abdul Rahman was elected as president of the two associations in 1951, both associations fought hard to have a first-class stadium built.

In 1952, an ad-hoc committee was formed by the Kuala Lumpur Municipal Commissioners to study the proposal, and a report was released three months later. Several proposals were also brought up to the Federal Legislative Council on this matter, including Tunku himself, but was blocked by the Council. After the winning of the Alliance Party in the first general election in Malaya, Tunku, who was now the Chief Minister, started an advisory committee led by E.M. McDonald to study the possibility of building a stadium. On 4 June 1956, a total of 160 proposal plan was submitted to the government.

On 2 May 1956, Tunku and McDonald started looking for suitable sites for the stadium, one of the first places they visited was the Chin Woo stadium. While standing on the tower of the stadium, Tunku saw a few athletes practicing near the Coronation Park, and asked "Don't you think it would make an ideal spot for Stadium Merdeka?" Although McDonald was concerned about the traffic congestion that might arise in the future, Tunku insisted that it was the perfect spot for the country's first stadium.

The site was a Chinese cemetery before it became the oldest golf course in Kuala Lumpur, which had been abandoned since 1921. The site was then later called "Coronation Park" when George VI was crowned as the King of United Kingdom. Before it was decided to build a stadium on that site, several quarters were planned to be built on the site by the Royal Malaysia Police. The uneven ground of the site means that excavation work had to be carried out before it could be constructed. The construction of the stadium would also mean that a small part of the school ground of Victoria Institution would be acquired. Despite McDonald's efforts to persuade Tunku to choose another site for the stadium, Tunku insisted on building the stadium there.

On 11 July, Tunku bought this up to the Legislative Council and gained permission from it. Four days later, the project was transferred to the Malayan Public Works Department.

Construction 
The stadium was constructed from 25 September 1956 to 21 August 1957, and was designed by the then Director of Public Works Department, Stanley Edward Jewkes. Several engineers such as Lee Kwok Thye, Chan Sai Soo and Peter Low were also involved in the project.  The cornerstone of the stadium was laid by Tunku himself on 15 February 1957.

Due to budget constraints, most of the construction materials were made locally, which meant that imported materials such as structural steels had to be avoided. To ensure that the stadium would be finished in time, the designing was done by "fast-track" method, which means that after each element of the design was finished, it was immediately constructed.

The stadium was constructed as an earthed amphitheatre, which means that a part of the stadium is below ground level. The excavated soil was then transferred to the site of Masjid Negara which was originally a valley and was subjected to flooding issues. When the earthworks and excavation were completed, designs of the terrace seating had already been done, and the construction of it began immediately. At the same time, the designing of the covered stands, the upper terraces and the stairs were carried on by the architects.

Two contractors were involved in the construction, Lim Quee for the construction of the main covered stands, while Boon & Cheah were responsible for the terrace and the tunnel entrances. Besides designing the stadium, Stanley Jewkes was also responsible for the traffic planning around the stadium. Other than Stanley, architect Edgar Green was also involved in the designing of the interior facilities such as the toilets and the canteen facilities of the restaurant. 

The stadium held two world records upon its completion: the tallest prestressed floodlight towers at 120 feet and the biggest cantilever shell roofs. The floodlight towers, constructed from Hume culvert pipes, was also the first prestressed tower in the world which was made from precast culvert pipe units. Another interesting feat accomplished at the time is that all four towers were erected without using a crane. The shell roof for the grandstand, made out of concrete, was chosen as it was both economically affordable and aesthetically beautiful. Although the strength of the cantilever roofs were tested before the ceremony, Stanley was concerned that the roof might be unable to withstand the vibrations caused by the firing of the cannons during the ceremony, but it did not happen and the event went well.

Engineer Lee Kwok Thye credited the Kongsi Woman, also known as Lai Sui Mui for their role in the construction. The women were responsible for carrying concrete buckets from the ground up to the structures being constructed, where it was then poured into the framework.

Opening and the declaration of independence 

The stadium was completed on 21 August 1957, while the opening ceremony was held on 30 August 1957, a day before the country declared independence. At the time of completion, it was the largest stadium in the Southeast Asia. The opening ceremony was opened by Tunku Abdul Rahman, which was witnessed by over 15,000 spectators, including foreign athletes. It was also Tunku himself who placed the foundation stone on 15 February 1957. The ceremony includes a mass drill performance by 1000 students.

On 31 August 1957, power was transferred from the British Empire to the newly independent Malayan government. More than 20,000 people crowded into the stadium, which was built specifically for this occasion. The ceremony was attended by Duke of Gloucester, representing the Queen of United Kingdom, the Malay rulers of the nine states, the last High Commissioner of Malaya Sir Donald Mac Gillivray, foreign dignitaries, members of the federal cabinet and Tunku Abdul Rahman himself. Following the handover of the instrument of the independence from Prince Henry to Tunku, the prime minister read out the Declaration of Independence, followed by the iconic seven shouts of "Merdeka" by Tunku. Following that, the national anthem was sung for the first time by a multiracial choir led by Tony Fonseka, while the national flag was raised by Oliver Cuthbert Samuel. The ceremony was continued with an azan call and a thanksgiving prayer, as well as a gun salute. A mass drill were also performed by the students on the event

Declaration of Malaysia 

On 16 September 1963, the stadium was the site of the proclamation of the formation of the Malaysia Federation. The event was witnessed by more than 30,000 audience and it was attended by the Yang di-Pertuan Agong, the Malay rulers, the Governor of Penang, Malacca, Singapore, Sarawak and Sabah, as well as the cabinet members, foreign diplomats and invited guests. The Proclamation of Malaysia, which was handed by the Yang di-Pertuan Agong, was read out by the Prime Minister, Tunku Abdul Rahman. He then shouted "Merdeka" seven times, which was echoed by the crowd. This was followed by the playing of the nobat orchestra and the national anthem played by the Royal Malaysia Police Band. It was then followed by a 101-gun salute by the first round of the Federation artillery. The event ended with the prayer by the Mufti of Negeri Sembilan, Ahmad Mohammad Said.

Plans for demolition 
The role of the stadium as the principal venue for celebrations and sporting events in Kuala Lumpur was replaced by the Bukit Jalil National Stadium built in the mid-1990s.

The stadium and its land were given to United Engineers Malaysia (UEM) which had intended to redevelop the land into a RM1 billion entertainment and office complex. However, the company did not proceed with the redevelopment due to public outcry and the company's financial difficulties due to the late 1990s Asian economic crisis. The stadium was now owned by Permodalan Nasional Berhad (PNB).

Several options were suggested following the acquirement of the site by PNB, such as redeveloping the stadium for smaller sporting activities, building a sport museum at the site, or relocate it to another site. Nonetheless, the stadium remained as a site for sporting events and concert until this day.

Renovations and restoration 
The stadium had been through several renovations. First in 1974 when the concrete upper tiers were added to increase the stadium capacity to 32,800 seats. The project costs about RM 4.5 million. In 1983, the floodlights of the stadium were replaced to make television colour transmission possible.  The seating capacity of the stadium was further increased in early 1986 with the addition of upper tiers rising into the airspace on the north, east and south terraces. Prior to the 1989 SEA Games, the grandstand was changed and the game's torch platform was built, were involved a set of grand steps leading up to the torch. The renovation, which cost RM 5.3 million, also includes the laying of new tracks, repairs to the roofs, enclosing sections of seating and repainting the seating terraces such that the stadium was ready for the Games.

In 2007, the stadium underwent massive renovations to restore its 1957 look. With that, the 45,000-capacity stadium was reduced to 20,000, which meant that several of the upper terrace blocks built over the years were demolished.  Besides that, the entire stadium was to be decorated as the state it was when Tunku proclaimed independence, which included the word "Merdeka" written in the stadium and the original seating arrangements of the Malay Rulers, the Queen's representatives and officers. The paintworks, main pavilion, two VIP rooms and the changing rooms were to be restored to its original state as well. The project, which costs RM2 million, was led by PNB.

Merdeka PNB 118 

In December 2009, it was announced that PNB would be building a hundred-floored skyscraper on the site between Stadium Merdeka and Stadium Negara. The project was officially launched by the then Prime Minister Najib Razak in September 2016. Formerly named as the Warisan Merdeka, the project was estimated to be finished by 2021. The tower, when completed, would be the second tallest building in the world and tallest in Southeast Asia. The tower would include 83 levels of office space, 16 levels of luxury hotel, and the rest of the floors would be occupied observation deck, restaurants, sky lobby, podium and amenities. Besides that, the project would also include a shopping mall and residential areas.

The tower was built on the Tunku Abdul Rahman Park (also known as Merdeka Park), which was built alongside the Stadium Merdeka. Such a move was criticized as the park was supposed to act as a heritage buffer zone. Plus, the park was also a recreation park for the residents in Kuala Lumpur for generations. The project might as well worsen the traffic congestion of that area. There was also concern that the schools nearby might be affected by the project and was forced to be relocated.

Sporting events

Football 
Prior to the completion of Bukit Jalil National Stadium, Stadium Merdeka was once the home ground for both the national football team (1957–1998) and Selangor FA (1957–1994), and was used temporary by the Kuala Lumpur FA in 1997. Besides that, it was also the venue for the annual Merdeka Football Tournament and most of the finals of the Malaysia Cup. The stadium had also hosted all the football matches for the 1965 SEAP Games, 1971 SEAP Games and the 1977 SEA Games, as well as the finals for the 1989 SEA Games.

The first match of the stadium was the opening match of the 1957 Merdeka Tournament, on 31 August 1957, between Hong Kong League XI and Cambodia. The Hong Kong League XI became the first team to win at Stadium Merdeka beating Cambodia with 6–2. The first goal was scored by Law Kwok-tai. On the next day, the Malayan national team play its first game at the stadium on a match against Burma, which finished 5–2. The national team will win its first Merdeka Cup in 1958 on a match against South Vietnam.

The first Malaya Cup final held at the stadium was played on October 19, 1957, between Selangor and Perak. Perak won the game by 3–2, becoming the first club to win a final at Stadium Merdeka. Perak also won the first Malaysia Cup at Stadium Merdeka after the cup was renamed in 1967. The stadium will continue to host 36 Malaysia Cup finals until the 1990s.

The stadium had also witnessed the first match played by the newly formed Malaysia football team, which is a combination of the Malaya and Singapore players (Singapore left in 1965 after the separation of Singapore with Malaysia). The match took place on 8 August 1963 (although the federation only existed after 16 September 1963) on the first round of the 1963 Merdeka Tournament against Japan. The team was defeated by 3–4.

The first South East Asia Peninsular Games football tournament held in Stadium Merdeka was the opening match between Thailand and South Vietnam on December 15, with Thailand winning the game by 2–1. The stadium will host the rest of the matches as well as the final held on December 22, which ended with a tie between Burma and Thailand. In 1989, the Malaysian national football team won their fourth SEA Games goal medal, the first at the stadium.

The first Olympic qualification match held at the stadium was the preliminary round between Malaysia and Thailand on 12 October 1964, which resulted a draw. In 1980, the stadium was the venue for the Olympics qualifying tournament. On 25 March, the stadium witnessed the qualification of Malaysia at the 1980 Olympic Games. The national team won the match against South Korea by 2–1, thus qualifying the Olympic Games for the second time. However, due to the boycott led by the United States, the country did not participate in the final tournament.

The first FIFA qualification match at the stadium was the match between Malaysia and South Korea on March 10, 1985.

Followed by the completion of the Shah Alam Stadium in 1994, both Selangor FA and the Malaysian national team moved to the newly built stadium. The national team will then move to the Bukit Jalil National Stadium after its completion in 1998.

The Malaysia Cup final was held again at the stadium since 1993, which was the match between Sarawak and Brunei in 1999, which resulted in a Brunei win 2–1. The stadium had never hosted any Malaysia Cup finals ever since.

In February 2015, Kuala Lumpur FA returned to Stadium Merdeka for the first time in 17 years for the team's opening Premier League match of the season against Sabah. The last international match played at the stadium saw the Malaysian team drawing 1–1 with Cambodia in October 2001.

Multi-sport event 
The stadium was the venue of the Brunei Merdeka Games, which was held to commemorate the Independence day of Malaya. Several events, including the Pestabola Merdeka, were held from 30 August to 8 September 1957. Besides football, the stadium had held cycling, athletics and hockey competition which were a part of the Games. A similar event was held in 1963 when the Malaysia Federation was formed.

Operated by Perbadanan Stadium Merdeka (1963–1998), the stadium had also held four out of six of the SEA Games held in Kuala Lumpur.  The stadium first host the Southeast Asia Games (known as the Southeast Asia Peninsular Games at that time) in 1965. Originally, Malaysia was planned to host the Games in 1967, however it was decided to be held in Malaysia after the original host, Laos had opted out due to financial difficulties. The stadium was the venue for the opening and closing ceremony, as well as athletics, football and cycling events. The stadium will continue to host the 1971, 1977 and 1989 editions.

The stadium had also hosted the first SUKMA Games in 1986. It will also be hosting the second SUKMA Games two years later.

Other sports 
In 1975, the stadium had hosted third Men's Hockey World Cup from 1 to 15 March 1975. India won its only Hockey World Cup after beating Pakistan by 2–1. The 1975 edition is also the Malaysian national team best performance, which won the fourth place in the event. The event was witnessed by over 50,000 spectators, despite the fact that the stadium had only 45,000 seats.

The stadium had also held the fight between Muhammad Ali and Joe Bugner on 1 July 1975. It was held as an exhibition bout as a part of the Far East tour. The match was held prior to the infamous Thrilla in Manila that was held three months later. About 20,000 spectators witnessed the fight in the stadium, including the Yang di-Pertuan Agong, the Prime Minister, several kings and governors, as well as Joe Frazier, Ali's former adversary. Ali won the fight by 73–67, 73–65 and 72–65 after the mandatory 15 rounds were over.

In athletics, the stadium was also used to held the 1991 Asian Athletics Championships, which was held in Kuala Lumpur. The event was held from 19 to 23 October. Aside from that, the stadium was also regularly used for national championships.

Other events

Concerts 

The Merdeka Stadium had also hosted major concerts. Uriah Heep held its first Malaysian concert at the stadium on 19 October 1983. Michael Jackson's HIStory World Tour filled the stadium to capacity. Jackson performed two sold-out concerts on 27 and 29 October 1996, respectively, in front of 55,000 people each night.

Linkin Park performed at the stadium in their Meteora World Tour on 15 October 2003. The concert was attended by over 28,000 audiences.
Mariah Carey first perform at the stadium on 20 February 2004 as a part of her Charmbracelet World Tour. She returned to the stadium ten years later in her The Elusive Chanteuse Show on 22 October 2014.

Celine Dion performed on 13 April 2008 for a total audience of 48,000 as a part of her Taking Chances World Tour. Avril Lavigne played her first show at the stadium on 29 August 2008. She will return to the stadium again in her Black Star Tour in 2012, and again in 2014 as a part of The Avril Lavigne Tour.

Justin Bieber performed at the stadium as a part of his debut world tour on 21 April 2011. Other Western artists who have played the stadium includes Jennifer Lopez, Cliff Richards, Scorpions, Metallica, My Chemical Romance and Bon Jovi.

Taiwanese singer Jolin Tsai first performed at the stadium on her Myself World Tour on 11 June 2011. She returned to the stadium again for her Play World Tour on 16 July 2016. On the following year, Mandopop singer Wang Leehom held his Music-Man Tour on March 3. He will return to the stadium again on 16 March 2019 as a part of his Descendants of the Dragon 2060 World Tour.

Chinese singer Jay Chou first performed at the stadium in 2003 on The One World Tour. The singer performed again at the stadium two years later on his Incomparable World Tour. His third appearance at the stadium was on February 23 as a part of The World Tour. Chou will return for his Invincible World Tour on August 6, 2016.

K-pop group EXO played the stadium on 12 March 2016 as a part of their Exo Planet #2 - The Exo'luxion World Tour. The group will return again on 18 March 2017 on their Exo Planet #3 - The Exo'rdium World Tour. Indian composer A.R. Rahman performed his A.R. Rahman Live in Concert on 14 May 2016 at the stadium. On the same year, South Korean group Big Bang held their MADE (V.I.P) Tour fan meeting at the stadium. G-Dragon performed in the stadium on his own solo tour Act III: M.O.T.T.E World Tour on 17 September 2017.

Malaysian singer Michael Wong held his Lonely Planet Concert Tour on 10 November 2018 at the stadium. He was the first local singer to held a solo concert at the stadium. Other Asian singers that had performed at the stadium include Kelly Chen, Beyond, Faye Wong, Wonder Girls, Jacky Cheung and Mayday.

Other shows held in the stadium include:
 Philiac Concert for Peace, May 2011
 B.o.B, Far East Movement, Mizz Nina, Watsons Music Festival, 15 December 2012

Political demonstrations 

On 9 July 2011, protesters of the Bersih 2.0 rally marched to the Merdeka Stadium. The decision was made after the organisers had consulted the Yang di-Pertuan Agong. On 12 January 2013, The People's Uprising rally was held in the stadium.

World records 
The stadium had witnessed the largest silat lesson in the world on 29 August 2015. The lesson was participated by 12,393 participants and was directed by Grandmaster YM Syeikh Dr. Md Radzi bin Hanafi, who is the Pewaris Mutlak Silat Cekak from Persekutuan Seni Silat Cekak Pusaka Ustaz Hanafi Malaysia. It was held in conjunction with the National Day celebration on that year.

Heritage conservation
In February 2003, Stadium Merdeka was named a national heritage building. In 2007, Merdeka Stadium underwent restoration to its original 1957 condition as part of Malaysia's 50th-anniversary plans to relive the moment when Tunku Abdul Rahman proclaimed independence there. The restoration was completed by December 2009. The restoration received the UNESCO Asia-Pacific 2008 Award of Excellence for Cultural Heritage Conservation.

Transportation
The stadium is served by the  Maharajalela Monorail station, situated next to one of the stadium's west exits. The station is situated between Tun Sambathan station and the Hang Tuah station.  

The stadium is also indirectly served by the  Merdeka MRT station. The station is situated in between Pasar Seni MRT station and Bukit Bintang MRT station on the Sungai Buloh-Kajang Line. Although its name refers to the stadium, the station serves the adjacent Stadium Negara instead.

The stadium can also be reached via the Ampang and Sri Petaling LRT Line by stopping at   Plaza Rakyat LRT station. A 180-metre pedestrian linkway was built from the station to the Merdeka MRT station, which is just a few blocks away from the stadium. The walkway was air-conditioned, brightly lit, and travelators were installed to ensure the comfort of the passengers.

The stadium can also be reached by bus. Located near the stadium, Pasar Seni bus hub is the terminating stop for a dozen of bus lines in the Klang Valley.

Gallery

See also
 Merdeka 118
Stadium Negara
Stanley Edward Jewkes
Bukit Jalil National Stadium
List of stadiums in Malaysia
Malayan Declaration of Independence

Notes

References

Further reading

External links 

 Merdeka 118 Precinct : Stadium Merdeka webpage

Football venues in Malaysia
Athletics (track and field) venues in Malaysia
Multi-purpose stadiums in Malaysia
Sports venues in Kuala Lumpur
Sports venues completed in 1957
1957 establishments in British Malaya
Southeast Asian Games stadiums
Southeast Asian Games athletics venues
Southeast Asian Games football venues
Selangor FA